Hugh Christian Watkins  (born 7 June 1959) is a British cardiologist. He is a Fellow of Merton College, Oxford, an associate editor of Circulation Research, and was Field Marshal Alexander Professor of Cardiovascular Medicine in the University of Oxford between 1996 and 2013.

Early life and education 
The son of Dr David Watkins, a Norfolk physician, and his wife Gillian Mary, Watkins was educated at Gresham's School, Holt, Norfolk and the St Bartholomew's Hospital Medical College, graduating in 1983 with both Bachelor of Science and Bachelor of Medicine, Bachelor of Surgery degrees. In 1984 he gained the Brackenbury & Bourne Prize in General Medicine. He was awarded a PhD from the University of London in 1995.

Career and Research 
Watkins was a house physician in the Professorial Medical Unit at St Bartholomew's Hospital in 1984–1985, then a senior house officer in Medicine at the John Radcliffe Hospital, Oxford, from 1985 to 1987. He was then briefly a senior house officer in Neurology at St Bartholomew's, before two years as a Registrar in Medicine and Cardiology at St Thomas's Hospital, London, from 1987 to 1989. His next posts were as a lecturer in Cardiological Sciences at St George's Hospital, London, and as Resident Fellow in Medicine at the Harvard Medical School and Brigham and Women's Hospital, Boston. In 1995 he was appointed an assistant professor of medicine at the Harvard Medical School and as associate physician at the Brigham & Women's Hospital, and in 1996 as Field Marshal Alexander Professor of Cardiovascular Medicine in the University of Oxford.

Watkins was elected to Membership of the Royal College of Physicians (MRCP) in 1987, graduated MD and PhD from the University of London in 1995, and was appointed a Fellow of the Royal College of Physicians (FRCP) in 1997.

At Oxford, Watkins is the Director of the British Heart Foundation's Molecular Cardiology Laboratory in the Wellcome Trust Centre for Human Genetics and of its Centre of Research Excellence, one of six similar programmes in the United Kingdom. He is also an associate editor of the academic journal Circulation Research.

Watkins's main specialism is in molecular genetic analysis of cardiovascular disease, and his most notable work is on the inheritance of heart disease, especially on hypertrophic cardiomyopathy and the genetic causes of "sudden cardiac death". He is chairman of an international group which investigates genetic susceptibility to coronary artery disease, which has funding from the European Commission.

Honours and awards
 British Heart Foundation Clinical Scientist Fellow, 1990
 Young Research Worker Prize of the British Cardiac Society 1992
 Fellow of the Royal College of Physicians, 1997
 Goulstonian Lecturer, Royal College of Physicians, 1998
 Graham Bull Prize, Royal College of Physicians, 2003
 Thomas Lewis Lecturer, British Cardiac Society, 2004
 Elected a Fellow of the Academy of Medical Sciences
 Fellow of the American Heart Association
 Elected Fellow of the Royal Society in 2017.

Publications
 Clinical Implications of Beta Cardiac Myosin Heavy Chain Mutations in Hypertrophic Cardiomyopathy (University of London, 1996)
 Papers in scientific journals, including the New England Journal of Medicine, Cell, and Nature Genetics

Personal life
In 1987, Watkins married Elizabeth Bridget Hewett, and they have one son and one daughter. In Who's Who his recreations are stated as "photography and Oriental porcelain".

References

1959 births
Field Marshal Alexander Professors of Cardiovascular Medicine
Alumni of the Medical College of St Bartholomew's Hospital
British cardiologists
Fellows of Exeter College, Oxford
Harvard Medical School faculty
Living people
People educated at Gresham's School
People from Norfolk
Fellows of the Royal Society
Fellows of Merton College, Oxford
NIHR Senior Investigators